The 2014 Saint Louis Billikens men's soccer team represented Saint Louis University during the 2014 NCAA Division I men's soccer season. It is the university's 56th season fielding a varsity soccer team, and the team's 28th season playing in the Atlantic 10 Conference.

Competitions

Preseason

Regular season

A10 Standings

Match results

References 

Saint Louis Billikens
Saint Louis Billikens men's soccer seasons
Saint Louis Billikens, Soccer Men
Saint Louis Billikens